Semien Shewa is the name of two administrative Zones in Ethiopia:
Semien Shewa Zone (Amhara)
Semien Shewa Zone (Oromia)